This is a list of notable restaurants in Scotland.

Restaurants in Scotland

Edinburgh

Glasgow
  
 Pink Peacock 
 

Links coming soon
 Cail Bruich (first M Star in Glasgow)
 Ox and Finch
 La Lanterna (oldest Italian)
 Rogano (oldest in general, 1935)

Elsewhere

Former restaurants
 Amaryllis (Glasgow)

See also

 Scottish cuisine
 List of companies of Scotland
 Lists of restaurants

References

Companies of Scotland
Scotland
Restaurants